The Tour de France is an annual men's multiple stage bicycle race primarily held in France, generally considered the most famous bicycle race in the world. It was founded by the French sports journalist and former professional road racing cyclist Henri Desgrange, who became the first director of the race. He was passionate about taking the Tour up to the highest reachable points of elevation in the Alps and Pyrenees using the most difficult routes.

The highest point of the first Tour de France in 1903 was the summit of the  Col de la République mountain pass in the Mont Pilat area of the Massif Central highland region. This point was again the highest for the next two Tours. 

The race first reached high altitude on the ninth edition in 1910 when it passed the  Col du Tourmalet in the Pyrenees. Not satisfied with that height, Desgrange the following year introduced his favoured Col du Galibier in the Alps, which summited at  via a single-laned  tunnel that first opened in 1891. At the time, Desgrange eulogised over the Galibier in comparison to the Tourmalet and other climbs, saying: "Oh Sappey, oh Laffrey, oh Bayard, oh Tourmalet! I will not shirk from my duty in proclaiming that compared to the Galibier you are no more than pale and vulgar babies; faced with this giant we can do no more than tip our hats and bow!" The Galibier was the highest point of elevation in each Tour to 1937, which led it to become one of the most iconic climbs in the race. , this remains the highest point of elevation reached by the Tour de France. Since 1962, all the highest points of Tours bar one have remained above , using passes in the high Alps and Pyrenees.

List

See also

 Souvenir Henri Desgrange – an award given in the Tour de France sometimes at its highest reached point
 Souvenir Jacques Goddet – an award given in the Tour de France mostly atop the Col du Tourmalet

Notes

References

Bibliography

 
 
 
 
 
 
 
 
 
 
 

highest points
Lists of highest points in Europe